Kadelburg is a German surname. Notable people with the surname include:

Gustav Kadelburg (1851–1925), Hungarian-German Jewish actor, dramatist, writer
Lavoslav Kadelburg (1910–1994), Croatian Jewish lawyer, judge, polyglot and activist

See also
 municipality in Küssaberg, Germany

German-language surnames
Jewish surnames
Yiddish-language surnames